Bojan Nastić (born 6 July 1994) is a Bosnian professional footballer who plays as a left-back for Ekstraklasa club Jagiellonia and the Bosnia and Herzegovina national team.

Nastić started his professional career at Vojvodina, before joining Genk in 2016. In 2019, he was loaned to Oostende. Later that year, Nastić moved to BATE Borisov. He signed with Jagiellonia in 2021.

A former Serbian youth international, Nastić made his senior international debut for Bosnia and Herzegovina in 2018.

Club career

Early career
Nastić started playing football at his hometown club Vlasenica, before joining youth academy of Serbian team Vojvodina in 2009. He made his professional debut against Rad on 7 April 2012 at the age of 17. On 25 May 2014, he scored his first professional goal in a triumph over Napredak Kruševac.

Genk
In August 2016, Nastić was transferred to Belgian outfit Genk for an undisclosed fee. He made his official debut for the club against Zulte Waregem on 28 August.

In April 2018, he extended his contract until June 2020.

In January 2019, Nastić was loaned to Oostende until the end of season.

He won his first trophy with the club on 20 July, by triumphing over Mechelen in Belgian Super Cup final.

BATE Borisov
In September, Nastić signed a multi-year deal with Belarusian outfit BATE Borisov. On 19 March 2020, he made his competitive debut for the side against Energetik-BGU. He won his first title with the club on 24 May, by beating Dynamo Brest in Belarusian Cup final after extra time. On 18 July, he scored his first goal for BATE Borisov in a defeat of Rukh Brest.

Jagiellonia
In January 2021, Nastić moved to Polish team Jagiellonia on a contract until June 2024. He debuted officially for the club on 7 February against Wisła Kraków. On 20 March, he scored his first goal for Jagiellonia in a victory over Lech Poznań.

International career
Despite representing Serbia at various youth levels, Nastić decided to play for Bosnia and Herzegovina at senior level.

In May 2018, his request to change sports citizenship from Serbian to Bosnian was approved by FIFA. Later that month, he received his first senior call-up, for friendly games against Montenegro and South Korea. He debuted against the former on 28 May.

Personal life
Nastić married his long-time girlfriend Eline in December 2019. Together they have a son named Mathea.

Career statistics

Club

International

Honours
Vojvodina
Serbian Cup: 2013–14

Genk
Belgian Super Cup: 2019

BATE Borisov
Belarusian Cup: 2019–20

References

External links

1994 births
Living people
People from Vlasenica
Serbs of Bosnia and Herzegovina
Naturalized citizens of Serbia
Serbian footballers
Serbia youth international footballers
Serbia under-21 international footballers
Serbian expatriate footballers
Bosnia and Herzegovina footballers
Bosnia and Herzegovina international footballers
Bosnia and Herzegovina expatriate footballers
Association football fullbacks
FK Vojvodina players
K.R.C. Genk players
K.V. Oostende players
FC BATE Borisov players
Jagiellonia Białystok players
Serbian SuperLiga players
Belgian Pro League players
Belarusian Premier League players
Ekstraklasa players
Expatriate footballers in Serbia
Expatriate footballers in Belgium
Expatriate footballers in Belarus
Expatriate footballers in Poland
Serbian expatriate sportspeople in Belgium
Serbian expatriate sportspeople in Belarus
Serbian expatriate sportspeople in Poland
Bosnia and Herzegovina expatriate sportspeople in Serbia
Bosnia and Herzegovina expatriate sportspeople in Belgium
Bosnia and Herzegovina expatriate sportspeople in Belarus
Bosnia and Herzegovina expatriate sportspeople in Poland